The Corey–Fuchs reaction, also known as the Ramirez–Corey–Fuchs reaction, is a series of chemical reactions designed to transform an aldehyde into an alkyne.  The formation of the 1,1-dibromoolefins via phosphine-dibromomethylenes was originally discovered by Desai, McKelvie and Ramirez. The second step of the reaction to convert dibromoolefins to alkynes is known as Fritsch–Buttenberg–Wiechell rearrangement. The overall combined transformation of an aldehyde to an alkyne by this method is named after its developers, American chemists Elias James Corey and Philip L. Fuchs.

By suitable choice of base, it is often possible to stop the reaction at the 1-bromoalkyne, a useful functional group for further transformation.

Reaction mechanism
The Corey–Fuchs reaction is based on a special case of the Wittig reaction, where two equivalents of triphenylphosphine are used with carbon tetrabromide to produce the triphenylphosphine-dibromomethylene ylide. 

This ylide undergoes a Wittig Reaction when exposed to an aldehyde. Alternatively, using a ketone generates a gem-dibromoalkene. 

The second part of the reaction converts the isolable gem-dibromoalkene intermediate to the alkyne. Deuterium-labelling studies show that this step proceeds through a carbene mechanism. Lithium-Bromide exchange is followed by α-elimination to afford the carbene. 1,2-shift then affords the deuterium-labelled terminal alkyne. The 50% H-incorporation could be explained by deprotonation of the (acidic) terminal deuterium with excess BuLi.

See also
Appel reaction
Fritsch-Buttenberg-Wiechell rearrangement
Seyferth-Gilbert homologation
Wittig reaction

References

  Corey, E. J.; Fuchs, P. L. Tetrahedron Lett. 1972, 13, 3769–3772. 
  Mori, M.; Tonogaki, K.; Kinoshita, A. Organic Syntheses, Vol. 81, p. 1 (2005). (Article )
  Marshall, J. A.; Yanik, M. M.; Adams, N. D.; Ellis, K. C.; Chobanian, H. R. Organic Syntheses, Vol. 81, p. 157 (2005). (Article )
  N. B. Desai, N. McKelvie, F. Ramirez JACS, Vol. 84, p. 1745-1747 (1962).

External links
Corey-Fuchs Alkyne Synthesis

Carbon-carbon bond forming reactions
Rearrangement reactions
Name reactions